Emam or Imam is a surname. Notable people with the surname include:

Adel Emam (born 1940), Egyptian actor
Amir Imam (born 1990), American boxer
Hamada Emam (1943–2016), Egyptian footballer, son of Yehia Emam
Hazem Emam (born 1975), Egyptian footballer, son of Hamada Emam
Hazem Mohamed Emam (born 1988), Egyptian footballer
Khaled El Emam, Canadian businessman and academic
Mohamed Imam (born 1984), Egyptian actor, son of Adel Emam
Silvana Imam (born 1986), Swedish rapper
Tarek Emam (born 1977), Egyptian writer
Yehia Emam (1919–1997), Egyptian footballer